Funerary reliefs of married couples were common in Roman funerary art. They are one of the most common funerary portraits found on surviving freedmen reliefs. By the fourth century, a portrait of a couple on a sarcophagus from the empire did not necessarily signify the burial of two spouses but instead demonstrated the importance of the material bond.

Lucius Antistius Sarculo and Antistia Plutia 

This relief originally was part of the funerary monument of Lucius Antistius Sarculo. This relief consists of two figures: a free-born Roman priest of the Salian order, and his wife and freedwoman (former slave) Antisia Plutia.

The relief is typical of the realistic style with the lined eyes, the hollowed cheeks and the prominent ears of the Antistius, along with other characteristic. Furthermore, the couple’s hairstyles indicate a date towards the end of the first century BC. Antistius' hair is cut close to his head, emphasizing his retreating hairline. Antistia's hair, drawn back into a small bun, with some curls brought forward and a small topknot at the front of the head, follows exactly the hairstyle of the Livia, wife of Emperor Augustus.

Via Statilia relief 

An example of a Late Roman Republic double portrait of a man and a woman, a husband and wife, that once decorated a tomb of the Via Statilia in Rome. The wife and husband were probably former slaves because slavery in ancient Rome was common. It has been estimated that Italy alone had about two million slaves. Some slaves gained freedom in return for their service, while other died as slaves in service of their original or new owner. As slaves, couples had no legal standing, after they had been freed former slaves became people in the eye of the law. Therefore, freedmen and freedwomen would portray themselves as married couple on their tombs.

Other examples

References 

Ancient Roman sculpture
Funerary steles
Funerary art
Reliefs